Falcade (Ladin: Falciade, German: Pfalden)   is a comune (municipality) in the Province of Belluno in the Italian region Veneto, located about  northwest of Venice and about  northwest of Belluno.

Falcade borders the following municipalities: Canale d'Agordo, Moena, Rocca Pietore, Soraga, Tonadico.

Falcade is on the edge of the Trevalli Ski Area:  of slopes stretching between Veneto and Trentino regions  which in turn is part of the Dolomite Super Ski area. It is also popular in the summer with walkers and mountain bikers.

Landmarks include the Church of Falcade, the Focobon massif (3,504 m) and the Mount Mulaz (2,906 m).

Twin towns
Falcade is twinned with:

  Massaranduba, Brazil, since 2011

People 
 Angelo Genuin (born 1939), ski mountaineer and cross-country skier

External links
 Official website 
 Falcade travel guide on Wikivoyage
 Dolomite Super Ski
 Scuola Italiana Sci Nordico Falcade

References

Cities and towns in Veneto